Phihyŏn County is a kun, or county, in northwestern North P'yŏngan province, North Korea.  It is bounded to the north by Ŭiju, to the east by Chŏnma, to the south by Yŏmju and Tongrim, and to the west by Ryongchŏn and the large city of Sinŭiju.  It was established as a separate county in 1952, and was subsequently reorganized in 1954, 1958, 1961, 1963, 1967 and 1978.

Geography
The land of Phihyŏn is generally flat in the west, rolling in the center, and rises to the low Munsu Mountains in the east. The chief of these peaks is Munsusan (문수산, 736 m).   The chief local stream is the Samgyochŏn (삼교천), a tributary of the Yalu River. Forestland covers 57% of the county's area (of that, pine forests account for 80%); 31% of the county is cultivated.

Administrative divisions
Phihyŏn is divided into 1 ŭp (town), 2 rodongjagu (workers' districts) and 21 ri (villages):

Climate
The year-round average temperature is 8.5 °C, dipping to a January mean of -9.5 °C and rising to 23.6 °C in August.  The annual rainfall averages 1065 mm.

Economy
Crops raised on that cultivated land include rice, maize, soybeans, and sweet potatoes.  Peanuts are also raised; Phihyon ranks second in the province in peanut production, and third in sheep production. The county is known for its hogs.

Phihyŏn is home to the Phihyŏn College of Land Administration.

Transportation
The Phyŏngŭi (Pyŏngyang-Sinŭiju) and Paengma (Yŏmju-South Sinŭiju) lines of the Korean State Railway pass through the county.

See also
Geography of North Korea
Administrative divisions of North Korea
North Pyongan

References

External links

Counties of North Pyongan